The 2013–14 FC Tom Tomsk season was the club's 1st season back in the Russian Premier League, the highest tier of football in Russia, following their relegation at the end of the 2011–12 season. They finished the season in 13th place, qualifying for the Relegation play-offs where they lost over two legs to FC Ufa and were relegated from the Premier League. Tom Tomsk also took part in the 2013–14 Russian Cup, where they reached the Quarter-finals, losing to Luch-Energiya Vladivostok.

Squad

First-team squad

Out on loan

Reserve squad

Transfers

Summer

In:

Out:

Winter

In:

Out:

Competitions

Russian Premier League

Matches

League table

Relegation play-offs

Russian Cup

Squad statistics

Appearances and goals

|-
|colspan="14"|Players away from the club on loan:

|-
|colspan="14"|Players who appeared for Tom Tomsk that left during the season:

|}

Top scorers

Disciplinary record

References

FC Tom Tomsk seasons
Tom Tomsk